What If... is the seventh full-length studio album by the American rock band Mr. Big, which was released on January 21, 2011 through Frontiers Records. It was the band's first album since their 2009 reunion, their first album in 10 years since 2001's Actual Size and their first album with the original line-up featuring guitarist Paul Gilbert since 1996's Hey Man.

The album was recorded between September–October 2010 in a Los Angeles-area studio with producer Kevin Shirley (Iron Maiden, Aerosmith, Rush, Black Country Communion).

The first single from the album, "Undertow", was released on November 27, 2010. A music video was filmed for the single and featured on the special edition DVD of the album The album was supported by a world tour in 2011.

Track listing

Personnel
Mr. Big
 Eric Martin – lead vocals
 Paul Gilbert – guitar, backing vocals
 Billy Sheehan – bass guitar, backing vocals
 Pat Torpey – drums, percussion and backing vocals

Production
Kevin Shirley – producer, mixing
Vanessa Parr – engineer at Village Recorders
Jared Kvitka – engineer at The Cave
Steve Hall – mastering at Future Disc, Los Angeles

Release history

References

External links
 'What If...' Album Review
 WHD Entertainment Website

Mr. Big (American band) albums
2010 albums
Frontiers Records albums
Albums produced by Kevin Shirley